Robert Keith McFerrin Jr. (born March 11, 1950) is an American folk and jazz singer. He is known for his vocal techniques, such as singing fluidly but with quick and considerable jumps in pitch—for example, sustaining a melody while also rapidly alternating with arpeggios and harmonies—as well as scat singing, polyphonic overtone singing, and improvisational vocal percussion. He is widely known for performing and recording regularly as an unaccompanied solo vocal artist. He has frequently collaborated with other artists from both the jazz and classical scenes.

McFerrin's song "Don't Worry, Be Happy" was a No. 1 U.S. pop hit in 1988 and won Song of the Year and Record of the Year honors at the 1989 Grammy Awards. McFerrin has also worked in collaboration with instrumentalists, including the pianists Chick Corea, Herbie Hancock, and Joe Zawinul, the drummer Tony Williams, and the cellist Yo-Yo Ma.

Early life and education
McFerrin was born in Manhattan, New York City in 1950, the son of operatic baritone Robert McFerrin and singer Sara Copper. He attended Cathedral High School in Los Angeles, Cerritos College, University of Illinois Springfield (then known as Sangamon State University) and California State University, Sacramento.

His mother Sara (Copper) McFerrin was a soloist and taught voice at Fullerton College in Southern California.

Career

McFerrin's first recorded work, the self-titled album Bobby McFerrin, was not produced until 1982, when McFerrin was already 31 years old. Before that, he had spent six years developing his musical style, the first two years of which he attempted not to listen to other singers at all, in order to avoid sounding like them. He was influenced by Keith Jarrett, who had achieved great success with a series of solo improvised piano concerts including The Köln Concert of 1975, and wanted to attempt something similar vocally.

In 1984, McFerrin performed onstage at the Playboy Jazz Festival in Los Angeles as a sixth member of Herbie Hancock's VSOP II, sharing horn trio parts with the Marsalis brothers.

In 1986, McFerrin was the voice of Santa Bear in Santa Bear's First Christmas, and in 1987 he was the voice of Santa Bear/Bully Bear in the sequel Santa Bear's High Flying Adventure. On September 24 of that same year, he performed the theme song for the opening credits of Season 4 of The Cosby Show.

In 1988, McFerrin recorded the song "Don't Worry, Be Happy", which became a hit and brought him widespread recognition across the world. The song's success "ended McFerrin's musical life as he had known it," and he began to pursue other musical possibilities on stage and in recording studios. The song was used as the official campaign song for George H. W. Bush in the 1988 U.S. presidential election, without Bobby McFerrin's permission or endorsement. In reaction, Bobby McFerrin publicly protested that use of his song, and stated that he was going to vote against Bush. He also dropped the song from his own performance repertoire.

At that time, he performed on the PBS TV special Sing Out America! with Judy Collins. McFerrin sang a Wizard of Oz medley during that television special.

In 1989, he composed and performed the music for the Pixar short film Knick Knack. The rough cut to which McFerrin recorded his vocals had the words "blah blah blah" in place of the end credits (meant to indicate that he should improvise). McFerrin spontaneously decided to sing "blah blah blah" as lyrics, and the final version of the short film includes these lyrics during the end credits. Also in 1989, he formed a ten-person "Voicestra" which he featured on both his 1990 album Medicine Music and in the score to the 1989 Oscar-winning documentary Common Threads: Stories from the Quilt.

Around 1992, an urban legend began that McFerrin had committed suicide; it has been speculated that the false story spread because people enjoyed the irony of a man known for the positive message of "Don't Worry, Be Happy" suffering from depression in real life. But in reality Mcferrin knew the song helped spread the message of positivity to the world abroad and was very proud of the work as a whole.

In 1993, he sang Henry Mancini's "Pink Panther Theme" for the 1993 comedy film Son of the Pink Panther.

In addition to his vocal performing career, in 1994, McFerrin was appointed as creative chair of the Saint Paul Chamber Orchestra. He makes regular tours as a guest conductor for symphony orchestras throughout the United States and Canada, including the San Francisco Symphony (on his 40th birthday), the New York Philharmonic, the Chicago Symphony Orchestra, the Cleveland Orchestra, the Detroit Symphony Orchestra, the Israel Philharmonic Orchestra, the Philadelphia Orchestra, the Los Angeles Philharmonic, the London Philharmonic, the Vienna Philharmonic and many others. In McFerrin's concert appearances, he combines serious conducting of classical pieces with his own unique vocal improvisations, often with participation from the audience and the orchestra. For example, the concerts often end with McFerrin conducting the orchestra in an a cappella rendition of the "William Tell Overture," in which the orchestra members sing their musical parts in McFerrin's vocal style instead of playing their parts on their instruments.

For a few years in the late 1990s, he toured a concert version of Porgy and Bess, partly in honor of his father, who sang the role for Sidney Poitier in the 1959 film version, and partly "to preserve the score's jazziness" in the face of "largely white orchestras" who tend not "to play around the bar lines, to stretch and bend". McFerrin says that because of his father's work in the movie, "This music has been in my body for 40 years, probably longer than any other music."

McFerrin also participates in various music education programs and makes volunteer appearances as a guest music teacher and lecturer at public schools throughout the U.S. McFerrin has collaborated with his son, Taylor, on various musical ventures.

In July 2003, McFerrin was awarded an Honorary Doctorate of Music from Berklee College of Music during the Umbria Jazz Festival where he conducted two days of clinics.

In 2009, McFerrin and psychologist Daniel Levitin hosted The Music Instinct, a two-hour documentary produced by PBS and based on Levitin's best-selling book This Is Your Brain on Music. Later that year, the two appeared together on a panel at the World Science Festival.

McFerrin was given a lifetime achievement award at the A Cappella Music Awards on May 19, 2018.

McFerrin was honored with the National Endowment for the Arts Jazz Masters award on August 20, 2020.

Personal life
He is the father of musicians Taylor McFerrin and Madison McFerrin, and actor Jevon McFerrin.

Vocal technique
As a vocalist, McFerrin often switches rapidly between modal and falsetto registers to create polyphonic effects, performing both the main melody and the accompanying parts of songs. He makes use of percussive effects created both with his mouth and by tapping on his chest. McFerrin is also capable of multiphonic singing.

A document of McFerrin's approach to singing is his 1984 album The Voice, the first solo vocal jazz album recorded with no accompaniment or overdubbing.

Discography

As leader

Studio albums

Singles

As sideman
Laurie Anderson, Strange Angels, 1989
Chick Corea, Rendezvous in New York, 2003
Jack DeJohnette, Extra Special Edition (Blue Note, 1994)
En Vogue, Masterpiece Theatre, 2000
Béla Fleck and the Flecktones, Little Worlds, 2003
Chico Freeman, Tangents, 1984
Gal Costa, The Laziest Gal in Town, 1991
Dizzy Gillespie, Bird Songs: The Final Recordings (Telarc, 1992)
Dizzy Gillespie, To Bird with Love (Telarc, 1992)
Herbie Hancock, Round Midnight, 1986
Michael Hedges, Watching My Life Go By, 1985
Al Jarreau, Heart's Horizon, 1988
Quincy Jones, Back on the Block, 1989
Charles Lloyd Quartet, A Night in Copenhagen (Blue Note, 1984)
The Manhattan Transfer, Vocalese, 1985
Wynton Marsalis, The Magic Hour, 2004
George Martin, In My Life, 1998
W.A. Mathieu, Available Light, 1987
Modern Jazz Quartet, MJQ & Friends: A 40th Anniversary Celebration (Atlantic, 1994)
Pharoah Sanders, Journey to the One (Theresa, 1980)
Grover Washington Jr., The Best Is Yet to Come, 1982
Weather Report, Sportin' Life, 1985
Yellowjackets, Dreamland, 1995
Joe Zawinul, Di•a•lects, 1986

Grammy Awards
1985, Best Jazz Vocal Performance, Male for "Another Night in Tunisia" with Jon Hendricks from the album Vocalese.
1985, Best Vocal Arrangement for Two or More Voices, "Another Night in Tunisia" with Cheryl Bentyne.
1986, Best Jazz Vocal Performance, Male, "Round Midnight" from the soundtrack album Round Midnight.
1987, Best Jazz Vocal Performance, Male, "What Is This Thing Called Love" from the album The Other Side of Round Midnight with Herbie Hancock.
1987, Best Recording for Children, "The Elephant's Child" with Jack Nicholson.
1988, Song of the Year, "Don't Worry, Be Happy" from the album Simple Pleasures.
1988, Record of the Year, "Don't Worry, Be Happy" from the album Simple Pleasures.
1988, Best Pop Vocal Performance, Male, "Don't Worry, Be Happy" from the album Simple Pleasures.
1988, Best Jazz Vocal Performance, "Brothers" from the album Duets by Rob Wasserman.
1992, Best Jazz Vocal Performance, "Round Midnight" from the album Play.
2023, Grammy Lifetime Achievement Award

References

External links

Bobby McFerrin official website
Bach & Friends documentary

1950 births
Living people
21st-century American conductors (music)
21st-century American male musicians
A cappella musicians
African-American classical musicians
African-American conductors (music)
20th-century African-American male singers
American beatboxers
American male conductors (music)
American jazz singers
California State University, Sacramento alumni
Classical musicians from New York (state)
Grammy Award winners
Jazz musicians from New York (state)
American male jazz musicians
Singers from New York City
Singers with a four-octave vocal range
Smooth jazz singers
Sony Classical Records artists
Whistlers
21st-century African-American musicians